As Long as They're Happy is a comedy play by the British writer Vernon Sylvaine which was first staged in 1953. A successful hit, it ran at the Garrick Theatre in the West End for 370 performances between July 1953 and May 1954. Veteran entertainer Jack Buchanan directed and starred as a stockbroker trying to cope with the extravagant behaviour of his daughters. Other members of the cast included Dorothy Dickson, Nigel Green, David Hutcheson and Stephen Hancock.

Film

In 1955 it was made into a musical film directed by J. Lee Thompson and with Buchanan reprising his starring role.

References

Bibliography
 Chibnall, Steve. J. Lee Thompson. Manchester University Press, 2000.
 Wearing, J.P. The London Stage 1950-1959: A Calendar of Productions, Performers, and Personnel. Rowman & Littlefield, 2014.

1953 plays
British plays adapted into films
Plays by Vernon Sylvaine
Plays set in London
Comedy plays
West End plays